Mario Kontny (born 7 April 1953) is a German former professional footballer who played as a defender for Werder Bremen.

References

External links
 

Living people
1953 births
German footballers
Association football defenders
Bundesliga players
SV Werder Bremen players